William Hume (3 April 1862 – 1941) was an Irish cyclist. He demonstrated the supremacy of John Boyd Dunlop's newly invented pneumatic tyres in 1889, winning the tyre's first ever races in Ireland and then England.

Career
In March 1889 Hume, the captain of the Belfast Cruisers Cycling Club, was the first member of the public to purchase a "safety bicycle" fitted with Dunlop's newly patented pneumatic tyres. Dunlop suggested that it would be advantageous to Hume to use them in a race.  Thus on 18 May 1889 he won all four cycling events at the Queen's College Sports held on the North of Ireland Cricket Club Grounds, (or Queens College playing fields) at Cherryvale, Belfast.

Entrepreneur and paper manufacturer  Harvey du Cros was present at the meet, and was so impressed that within six months he had acquired the patent rights (or in 1896) for £3,000 and floated the first Pneumatic Tyre Company.

Hume went on to be the person to introduce the new invention to England, when, in 1889, he raced on pneumatics in Liverpool, winning all but one of the cycling events.

Hume's achievements were celebrated in 1938 when Cycling Weekly, then known simply as Cycling awarded him his own page in the Golden Book of Cycling.

Patent dispute
Dunlop's patent, which he had sold to Du Cros, was legally disputed. Two years after he was granted the patent Dunlop was officially informed that it was invalid as Scottish inventor Robert William Thomson (1822–1873) had patented the idea in France in 1846 and in the US in 1847. Dunlop's patent was later declared invalid on the basis of Thomson's prior art.

References

Further reading
Warwick University - A Catalogue of the papers of John Boyd Dunlop (1840-1921). Warwick University, Dunlop patents submissions
 MSS.328/N5/3/2/13A Typescript Legal Statements concerning the invention of the pneumatic tyre [sic] ? c.1890

Websites 

 https://www.roadbikerider.com/who-in-the-world-was-willie-hume-d1/

 Statement made by John Boyd Dunlop to John B. Purchase of 11 Queen Victoria Street for the Pneumatic Tyre Company, charting the history of his invention of the pneumatic tyre, undated.

 Pages three and four of a statement made by Finlay Sinclair to the same [pages one and two not present].

 Statement of William Hume of Temple More Avenue, Belfast, manufacturer, attached to the above, in which he claimed to have been the first person to have purchased a roadster cycle fitted with Dunlop tyres. This happened in March 1889. In May 1889 he purchased a Dunlop racer and won four first prizes at the Queen's College Sports, Belfast. This statement is annotated in manuscript by Dunlop.

These statements are in draft form with manuscript alterations Warwick University, Dunlop patents submissions

1862 births
1941 deaths
Irish male cyclists
Irish people of Scottish descent
Sportspeople from Belfast
Date of death missing